Sleap Airfield (pronounced "Slape")  is located  north of Shrewsbury, Shropshire, England.

Sleap Aerodrome has a CAA Ordinary Licence (Number P641) that allows flights for the public transport of passengers or for flying instruction as authorised by the licensee (Shropshire Aero Club Limited).

RAF Sleap

Sleap (pronounced "Slape") is an ex-Royal Air Force airfield, which was opened in April 1943, and used by RAF advanced flying training units. Initially it was the base for No. 81 Operational Training Unit RAF (81 OTU) within No. 93 Group RAF (93 Gp) of RAF Bomber Command equipped with Armstrong Whitworth Whitley bomber aircraft.

From 1 January 1944 Sleap was assigned to No.38 Group RAF (38 Gp). 81 OTU's Armstrong-Whitworth Whitleys towed Airspeed Horsa heavy troop-carrying gliders on training missions; the Horsas making practice formation landings at RAF Sleap to simulate attacks in enemy territory. Vickers Wellingtons replaced the Whitleys from November 1944 and by January 1945 the strength was 51 Wellington T.Xs, used to train Transport Command air-crew. The RAF finally released Sleap in 1964, but the location is still used as a relief airfield by nearby RAF Shawbury for Juno and Jupiter aircraft from the DHFS as part of the UKMFTS.

The Shropshire Aero Club members' bar (also a cafe open to the public) at Sleap is named Eric Lock Lounge after Bayston Hill born Flight Lieutenant Eric Lock the World War II Battle of Britain pilot who was the highest scoring British-born pilot with sixteen and a half victories during the epic battle. There is also the Wartime Aircraft Recovery Group museum open at weekends.

References

External links
Shropshire Aero Club
Exploring RAF Sleap
Sleap by helicopter

Airports in England
Transport in Shropshire
Airports in the West Midlands (region)